Dimeria kalliadense is a plant in the family Poaceae collected from Northern Kerala. It grows up to 10 centimeters long. The plant has been found in Blathur, Peringome and Kanai in Kannur District and also at Karinthalam, Madikai and Seethamgoli in Kasaragod district in Kerala.

References 

Grasses of India
Flora of Kerala
Plants described in 2017
Andropogoneae